The National Cultural Centre, the premier auditorium for cultural presentations in Georgetown, Guyana. It is on Homestretch Avenue, in D’Urban Park (south of the Botanical Gardens). It hosts theatre, music, and dance as well as other events.

The centre is decorated with a chandelier made of local woods over the main staircase, and a Denis Williams mural, entitled Memorabilia 11.

After the destruction of the Assembly Rooms, the auditoriums of Queen's College and St Rose's High School were mainly used for major cultural presentations. The idea of establishing a National Cultural Centre can be traced back to 1951 when a foundation stone was laid on the site that now houses the Bank of Guyana building. The decision to erect the Centre was made early in 1971 and Guyanese architects were invited to submit designs for the building in a competition held that year.  From the four entries received, the design submitted by Norris Mitchell Associates was selected. 

It was unfinished by 1972, when Guyana hosted the Caribbean Festival Creative Arts (Carifesta), but the unfinished structure was used anyway, with the aid of three large canvas tents to complete the roofing, and coconut palm fronts as walls. The Jamaica National Ballet was the first group to perform there, as part of Carifesta 72.

The centre was officially opened on 16 May 1976.

The centre received sound system upgrades in 2019

It houses the National Drama School, and hosted the National Drama Festival until 2017.

References

Buildings and structures in Georgetown, Guyana
Event venues established in 1976